Paco is a 2009 Argentine drama film written and directed by Diego Rafecas. It was shot in Buenos Aires and South Africa.

Synopsis
The film is named after the protagonist Francisco Black aka "Paco" (Tomás Fonzi), a college student who starts using cocaine paste, a cocaine byproduct known as "paco". Son of a senator, Francisco falls in love with a cleaning worker. He follows her into Buenos Aires' underworld only to find that his girlfriend has committed suicide after accepting to prostitute herself in exchange for drugs. Seeking revenge, Francisco places a bomb in the drug factory murdering several innocents. As a result of being accused of terrorism charges, his mother uses his influences to try to exculpate him, but she is forced to confine him in a detox clinic, where Francisco finds a bunch of lost souls.

Reviews
Variety has called the film «an emotive character-driven rehab drama with a strong ensemble cast».

References

External links
 
 

2009 films
2009 romantic drama films
Films about drugs
Films about prostitution in Argentina
Films about suicide
Argentine films about revenge
Films set in psychiatric hospitals
Films shot in Buenos Aires
Films shot in South Africa
Argentine romantic drama films
2000s Argentine films